Einar William "Bill" Giaver (May 29, 1898 – June 20, 1991) was an American football back in the National Football League (NFL). He played for the Hammond Pros, Rock Island Independents, Racine Legion, Chicago Bulls, and Louisville Colonels from 1922 to 1926. He played collegiately for Georgia Tech.

References

1898 births
Players of American football from Chicago
American football fullbacks
American football halfbacks
Georgia Tech Yellow Jackets football players
Hammond Pros players
Rock Island Independents players
Racine Legion players
Louisville Colonels (NFL) players
1991 deaths